The Mousecar is an in-house award given by The Walt Disney Company for a variety of reasons, including service to the company as well as to the community as a whole. The award was first presented by Disney founder Walt Disney to his brother Roy O. Disney in 1947.

In 2005, Riley Thomson's Mousecar was auctioned for $5,358. In 2013 Bernie Cobb's Mousecar was auctioned for $8,531.

Origin of the word
"Mousecar" is a combination of the words "Oscar" and "Mouse" (as in Mickey Mouse).

List of recipients

Floyd Gottfredson
Manuel Gonzales
Marc Davis
Dick Huemer
Louis Armstrong
Benny Goodman
Bernie Cobb
Sherman Brothers
Riley Thomson
Kathie Lee Gifford
Lucille Ogle
Elmo Williams
Ed Wynn
Robert Stevenson
Winnie Grosso
Zack Schaja
Bob Dorfman 
Roy O. Disney
Jim Gardner

During the studio's 50th anniversary in 1973 special Mousecars were given to every employee who had worked at the original Disney Studio on Hyperion Street (1929-1939) in the Los Feliz section of Los Angeles, designating them members of the exclusive Hyperion Club.

See also
 Disney Legends
 Duckster

References

External links
Photo from the October 1963 party in the Penthouse Club at the Disney Studio where Mousecars and Ducksters were presented to Disney comic strip writers and artists (left to right: Bob Karp, Walt Disney, Floyd Gottfredson, Al Taliaferro, Manuel Gonzales and Roy O. Disney)
Dick Huemer in the Penthouse Club 1973 (left to right: Jack Cutting, Bill Cottrell, Huemer and Les Clark.

American awards
The Walt Disney Company